L'Événement means "The Happening" in French. It may refer to:

 L'Événement-Journal, a Canadian newspaper
 L'Événement (novel), a 2000 novel by Annie Ernaux (translated as Happening)
 L'Événement (film), a 2021 film based on the novel (also titled Happening)